Scott Wolf is an actor.

Scott Wolf(f) or Wolfe may also refer to:

 J. Scott Wolff, politician
 Scotty Wolfe (1908–1997), American Baptist minister 
 Scott Wolfe (American football), player for Australia national American football team

See also
Scott/Wolfe, songwriting team